Melzerella costalimai is a species of beetle in the family Cerambycidae. It was described by Seabra in 1961.

References

Aerenicini
Beetles described in 1961